Philippa Scott (born November 10, 1935) is an American actress who has appeared in film and television since the 1950s.

Personal life
Scott was born in Los Angeles, California. She is the daughter of actress Laura Straub and screenwriter Allan Scott; an uncle was the blacklisted screenwriter Adrian Scott. Scott married Lee Rich, a founding partner of Lorimar Productions, in 1964. They had two children together before they divorced in 1983, though they maintained a friendship until his death in 2012.

In the 1970s, along with steady work acting in television productions, Scott was a student at California State Polytechnic University, Pomona, where she pursued a degree in landscape architecture.

By the 1990s, Scott had become active in human-rights work, such as supporting the Commission of Experts formed under United Nations Security Council Resolution 780 in its research of the "widespread violations of international humanitarian law" committed during the Bosnian genocide.

Acting career

Scott attended Radcliffe and UCLA before studying at the Royal Academy of Dramatic Art in England. Shortly after her return to the United States, she won a Theatre World Award for her 1956 Broadway debut in Child of Fortune. Scott then quickly signed a contract with Warner Bros. and made her movie debut that same year as Lucy, a niece of John Wayne's character in John Ford's epic The Searchers.

Scott was cast in the 1958 film As Young as We Are in the role of a new high-school teacher who falls in love with the character Hank Moore, played by Robert Harland, who turns out to be a student. She appeared as Pegeen in the 1958 Warner Bros. film, Auntie Mame.

She appeared as Abigail in the 1959 episode of Maverick titled "Easy Mark" starring Jack Kelly as Bart Maverick. In the 1959–1960 CBS Television series Mr. Lucky, starring John Vivyan and Ross Martin, she had a recurring role as Maggie Shank-Rutherford. Around this time, she also appeared on the ABC-TV Western series, The Alaskans, starring Roger Moore. 

Scott guest-starred on such series as The DuPont Show with June Allyson, The Twilight Zone in "The Trouble with Templeton" starring Brian Aherne and Sydney Pollack (in which she performed a bravura 1920s dance sequence), Thriller, F Troop, Have Gun - Will Travel with Richard Boone, Redigo, The Tall Man with Clu Gulager, The Dick Van Dyke Show, The Rat Patrol, Gomer Pyle, U.S.M.C., and Gunsmoke (as a white woman, taken by Indians during a raid, who during a year of captivity falls in love with an Indian suitor in the S7E10 “Indian Ford” in 1961). 

In 1962–1963, she appeared in the first season of NBC's The Virginian in the recurring role of Molly Wood, publisher, editor, and reporter of The Medicine Bow Banner. She made two guest appearances on Perry Mason, starring Raymond Burr. In 1963, she played defendant Gwynn Elston in "The Case of the Bigamous Spouse"; in 1966, she played defendant Ethel Andrews in "The Case of the Fanciful Frail".

In 1964, she guest-starred with Eddie Albert and Claude Rains in the episode "A Time to Be Silent" of The Reporter. She guest-starred in "The Garden House", an episode of ABC's The Fugitive, starring David Janssen. Her last notable film roles were the wife of Dick Van Dyke's character in the comedy Cold Turkey (1971), and as Dabney Coleman's wife in the TV movie Bad Ronald (1974), although she sporadically played minor characters throughout the 1970s and '80s, including a 1971 guest spot in the episode "Didn't You Used to Be ... Wait ... Don't Tell Me" of The Mary Tyler Moore Show.

In 1972, Scott appeared in the educational short film Magical Disappearing Money, where she starred as a grocery consultant advising people about saving money by buying cheaper items, and how they can substitute for expensive items. The short was later featured on the RiffTrax website and YouTube channel.

She played an actress stranded in Virginia due to money problems in a 1973 episode of The Waltons. In 1973, she played a murder victim in Columbo: Requiem for a Falling Star. Her last regular TV role was as nursery-school teacher Maggie Hearn in the 15-episode 1976 NBC police drama Jigsaw John starring Jack Warden.

She returned to the big screen in 2011's Footprints, for which she was nominated for the Stockholm Krystal Award for Best Supporting Actress at the Method Fest Independent Film Festival.

Off-screen work in film
Scott produced, wrote the screenplay for, and directed King Leopold's Ghost (2006), a film based on the book of the same name by Adam Hochschild.

Filmography

References

External links
 
 
 
 

American film actresses
American television actresses
Actresses from New York City
Actresses from Los Angeles
Living people
Radcliffe College alumni
University of California, Los Angeles alumni
Alumni of RADA
20th-century American actresses
21st-century American actresses
Warner Bros. contract players
Year of birth missing (living people)